Rudolf Perz (born 31 May 1972) is a former Austrian footballer and current manager. He currently manages ASKÖ Köttmannsdorf.

External links
 

1972 births
Living people
Austrian footballers
FC Kärnten players
Association football midfielders
SK Austria Klagenfurt managers
Austrian football managers